Foxford railway station serves the town of Foxford in County Mayo, Ireland.

The station is on the Dublin to Ballina service (Direct or Transfer at Manulla Junction). Passengers can travel to Westport by travelling to Manulla Junction and changing trains.

The station opened on 1 May 1868. It was closed in 1963 and reopened in 1988.

The line is owned by the state company Córas Iompair Éireann (CIÉ), and previously by the Midland Great Western Railway. The station has a single track and platform. The remains of a second platform on the western side of the line are still visible.

Gallery

See also
 List of railway stations in Ireland

References

External links
Irish Rail Foxford Station Website

Iarnród Éireann stations in County Mayo
Railway stations in County Mayo
Railway stations opened in 1868
Railway stations closed in 1963
Railway stations opened in 1988